Edouard "Ed" Bugnion (born 1970) is a Swiss software architect and businessman.

Biography 
Bugnion was raised in Neuchâtel, Switzerland.

Bugnion graduated with a bachelor's degree in engineering from ETH Zurich in 1994 and a master's degree from Stanford University in 1996. He was one of the five founders of VMware in 1998 (with his advisor Mendel Rosenblum) and was the chief architect until 2004.  He had been a Ph.D. candidate in computer science at Stanford University prior to co-founding VMware. While he was chief architect, VMware developed the secure desktop initiative also known as NetTop for the US National Security Agency. 
His primary research interests are in operating systems and computer architectures, and he was a key member of the SimOS and Disco virtual machine research teams.

After VMware, Bugnion was a founder of Nuova Systems which was funded by Cisco Systems, and acquired by them in April 2008. Bugnion joined Cisco as vice president and chief technology officer of Cisco's Server Access and Virtualization Business Unit. He promoted Cisco's Data Center 3.0 vision, and appeared in advertisements. He resigned from Cisco in 2011 and resumed his PhD program of study at Stanford University, which he graduated from in 2012.  In 2014, he became Adjunct Professor at the School of Computer Science at EPFL, Switzerland, where he is now a Full Professor and the Vice President for Information Systems.

Bugnion co-authored papers on operating systems and platform virtualization such as  “Disco: Running Commodity Operating Systems on Scalable Multiprocessors,” in 1997.

Bugnion is also an angel investor in startup companies such as Cumulus Networks.

He was elected as an ACM Fellow in 2017.

In 2020, Bugnion took a key role in fighting Covid19 through Exposure Notification, as a principal member of the team behind the concept and the implementation in Switzerland. He was also a member of the Swiss National COVID-19 Science Task Force.

References

Living people
1970 births
People from Neuchâtel
Chief technology officers
Fellows of the Association for Computing Machinery